The Caproni Bergamaschi PL.3 was designed and built in Italy to compete in the 1934 London-to-Melbourne air race. It was a single-engine cantilever monoplane with clean lines, retractable undercarriage and side-by-side seating for two.  Though it was registered as a race entrant, late delays prevented it from competing.

Design and development

The PL.3 had a low wing built entirely of wood, covered with plywood, tapering uniformly both in chord and thickness from wide, deep roots to rounded tips. The tail was conventional, the tailplane set at mid-fuselage with straight swept leading edges and carrying elevators with trim tabs.  The fin was triangular, with a rounded rudder ending above the fuselage.

In contrast the fuselage of the PL.3 was mostly of metal construction. From propeller to aft of the wing root the fuselage was a tube of constant diameter, set by the wide chord NACA cowling around its 525 kW (700 hp) licence-built Pratt & Whitney Hornet radial engine, which then tapered to the tail.  The underlying structure from nose to tail was a rectangular chrome molybdenum steel frame, aluminium covered in front and plywood behind.  The low profile cockpit placed the crew at the wing trailing edge.  The PL.3 had a conventional undercarriage with mainwheels retracting rearwards into the wing, leaving a small part exposed.

Operational history
The PL.3 was one of many types entered into the London-Melbourne race of 1934 for the MacRobertson Trophy and £10,000 prize. The race was scheduled to start on 20 October 1934 The PL.3 was entered in May 1934. By early September it had a race number, 61, and the crew had been elected; though it had not flown it was still an expected competitor.  The crew were known: both Francis Lombardi and Vittori Suster were experienced flyers with careers beginning in the First World War. Lombardi had made many competitive long-distance flights and Suster had spent the last seven years as an airline pilot, latterly as chief pilot.

The exact reasons for its non-participation are not known, but the PL.3 was one of many registered competitors which cancelled early or failed to appear at RAF Mildenhall, the starting point, in the week before the start.

Specifications

References

PL.3
1930s Italian sport aircraft
Low-wing aircraft
Single-engined tractor aircraft